The 2016–17 Second League (known as the Spor Toto 2. Lig for sponsorship reasons) is the third level in the Turkish football.

Teams 
1461 Trabzon, Kayseri Erciyesspor and Karşıyaka relegated from 2015–16 TFF First League.
Ümraniyespor, Manisaspor and Bandırmaspor promoted to 2016–17 TFF First League.
Erzurum BB, Etimesgut Belediyespor, Kastamonuspor, Zonguldak Kömürspor, Ofspor and Niğde Belediyespor promoted from 2015–16 TFF Third League.
Bayrampaşaspor, Pazarspor, Orduspor, Kartalspor, Ankara Demirspor and Tarsus İY relegated to 2016–17 TFF Third League.

Locations

White Group

League table

Red Group

League table

Promotion playoffs

Quarterfinals

Semifinals

Final

See also 
 2016–17 Turkish Cup
 2016–17 Süper Lig
 2016–17 TFF First League
 2016–17 TFF Third League

References

External links
TFF 2.LIG

TFF Second League seasons
3
Turkey